Gagu may refer to: 
 Gagu people, a Mandé ethnic group of Côte d'Ivoire
 Gagu language, the Niger–Congo language they speak
 Gagu River of Romania
 Gagu, a village in Dascălu Commune, Ilfov County, Romania

Language and nationality disambiguation pages